The Doris Day Christmas Album is an album of Christmas songs performed by Doris Day with an orchestra conducted by Pete King, released by Columbia Records on September 14, 1964, as a monophonic LP album (catalog number CL-2226) and a stereophonic LP album (catalog CS-9026).

Track listing
"Silver Bells" (Jay Livingston, Ray Evans)
"I'll Be Home for Christmas" (Kim Gannon, Walter Kent, Buck Ram)
"Snowfall" (Claude Thornhill, Ray Charles)
"Toyland" (Victor Herbert, Glen MacDonough)
"Let It Snow! Let It Snow! Let It Snow!" (Sammy Cahn, Jule Styne)
"Be a Child at Christmas Time" (Martin Broones, William A. Luce)
"Winter Wonderland" (Felix Bernard, Richard B. Smith)
"The Christmas Song (Chestnuts Roasting on an Open Fire)" (Mel Tormé, Bob Wells)
"Christmas Present" (Sydney Robin)
"Have Yourself a Merry Little Christmas" (Hugh Martin, Ralph Blane)
"The Christmas Waltz" (Sammy Cahn, Jule Styne)
"White Christmas" (Irving Berlin)

Doris Day albums
1964 Christmas albums
Christmas albums by American artists
Columbia Records Christmas albums
Covers albums
Pop Christmas albums